David K. Rusnell (born July 31, 1933), was a Canadian ice hockey player with the Trail Smoke Eaters. He won a gold medal at the 1961 World Ice Hockey Championships in Switzerland. He also played with the Spokane Comets, Kimberley Dynamiters, and Rossland Warriors.

References

1933 births
Living people
Canadian ice hockey centres
Spokane Comets players
People from Wadena, Saskatchewan
Ice hockey people from Saskatchewan